Christopher Williams (16 June 1927 – 30 August 2012) was a British bobsledder. He competed in the two-man and the four-man events at the 1956 Winter Olympics.

References

1927 births
2012 deaths
British male bobsledders
Olympic bobsledders of Great Britain
Bobsledders at the 1956 Winter Olympics
Sportspeople from London